Ze with caron (З̌, з̌; italics: З̌, з̌) is an additional letter of the Cyrillic script used in the Nganasan and Shughni languages. It is composed of the letter ze  and a caron. It was to represent ž, until it was replaced by Ж.

Computing codes 
Ze with caron can be represented by the following Unicode characters :

Bibliography 

 
Cyrillic letters with diacritics
Letters with caron